Palmadusta asellus is a species of sea snail, a cowry, a marine gastropod mollusk in the family Cypraeidae, the cowries.

Description 
The shells are white with three large brown transversal bands on the upper surface. The brown mantle shows several whitish spots. In the living cowry it covers almost entirely the shells.

Subspecies 
Palmadusta asellus is divided into the following subspecies:

 Palmadusta asellus asellus (Linnaeus, 1758)
 Palmadusta asellus bitaeniata (Geret, 1903)
 Palmadusta asellus latefasciata Schilder, 1930
 Palmadusta asellus vespacea (Melvill, 1905)

Distribution 
This species is distributed in the seas along Aldabra, Chagos, the Comores, Kenya, Madagascar, Mauritius, Mozambique, the Red Sea, Réunion, the Seychelles and Tanzania.

References 

 Verdcourt, B. (1954). The cowries of the East African Coast (Kenya, Tanganyika, Zanzibar and Pemba). Journal of the East Africa Natural History Society 22(4) 96: 129–144, 17 pls
 Burgess, C.M. (1970). The Living Cowries. AS Barnes and Co, Ltd. Cranbury, New Jersey
 Sea Life Base

External links 
 

Cypraeidae
Gastropods described in 1758
Taxa named by Carl Linnaeus